Saeed Lotfi may refer to:

 Saeed Lotfi (footballer born 1981), Iranian retired football defender
 Saeed Lotfi (footballer born 1992), Iranian football defender who plays for Naft Tehran